One World Youth Project (OWYP) is a non-profit 501(c)(3) corporation founded in Massachusetts. Its goal is to create a more knowledgeable, compassionate, skilled, and understanding generation of global citizens while at the same time, inspiring youths to take effective action now.

Origin
The Massachusetts, United States based organization was founded in 2004, by  Jessica Rimington, who at the time was 18 years old.

Program
OWYP is a sister-school program for middle and high school students, linking groups in North America, with groups from around the world in learning partnerships for the purpose of community service toward the achievement of the United Nations Millennium Development Goals. The OWYP educational program allows youth to explore and better understand their own community, while learning about the community of their sister-group overseas. Each sister-group ultimately takes action on their UN Millennium Development Goal through a local service project. Over 60 schools were paired in OWYP's first four years.

See also 

 List of youth empowerment organizations
 Youth work
 Mature minor doctrine
 International Youth Change Maker
 Positive youth development

References

External links
One World Youth Project official site

Non-profit organizations based in the United States
2004 establishments in Massachusetts
Youth organizations based in the United States